Giovanni Luigi Guarini (died November 1579) was a Roman Catholic prelate who served as Bishop of Aquino (1579).

On 30 March 1579, Giovanni Luigi Guarini was appointed during the papacy of Pope Gregory XIII as Bishop of Aquino. He served as Bishop of Aquino until his death in November 1579.

References

External links and additional sources
 (for Chronology of Bishops) 
 (for Chronology of Bishops) 

16th-century Italian Roman Catholic bishops
Bishops appointed by Pope Gregory XIII
1579 deaths